Love Me Now may refer to:

"Love Me Now" (Melanie Amaro song), 2012
"Love Me Now" (John Legend song), 2016
"Love Me Now", by Gino Vannelli from Storm at Sunup, 1975
"Love Me Now", by Sheppard from Watching the Sky, 2018
"Love Me Now", a single from DJs Ofenbach 2022 album I
Love Me Now?, a 2018 album by Tory Lanez